Gothic rock (also called goth rock or simply goth) is a style of rock music that emerged from post-punk in the United Kingdom in the late 1970s. The first post-punk bands which shifted toward dark music with gothic overtones include Siouxsie and the Banshees, Joy Division, Bauhaus, and the Cure.

The genre itself was defined as a separate movement from post-punk. Gothic rock stood out due to its darker sound, with the use of primarily minor or bass chords, reverb, dark arrangements, or dramatic and melancholic melodies, having inspirations in gothic literature allied with themes such as sadness, nihilism, dark romanticism, tragedy, melancholy and morbidity. These themes are often approached poetically. The sensibilities of the genre led the lyrics to represent the evil of the century and the romantic idealization of death and the supernatural imagination. Gothic rock then gave rise to a broader goth subculture that included clubs, fashion and publications in the 1980s, 1990s, and into the 21st century.

Characteristics 
According to music journalist Simon Reynolds, standard musical fixtures of gothic rock include "scything guitar patterns, high-pitched basslines that often usurped the melodic role [and] beats that were either hypnotically dirgelike or tom-tom heavy and 'tribal'". Reynolds described the vocal style as consisting of "deep, droning alloys of Jim Morrison and Leonard Cohen". Several acts used drum machines downplaying the rhythm's backbeat.

Gothic rock typically deals with dark themes addressed through lyrics and the music's atmosphere. The poetic sensibilities of the genre led gothic rock lyrics to exhibit literary romanticism, morbidity, existentialism, religious symbolism, or supernatural mysticism. Gothic rock is an offshoot of post-punk and, according to AllMusic, "took the cold synthesizers and processed guitars of post-punk and used them to construct foreboding, sorrowful, often epic soundscapes." Early gothic rock had introspective or personal lyrics, but according to AllMusic, "its poetic sensibilities soon led to a taste for literary romanticism, morbidity, religious symbolism, and/or supernatural mysticism."

History

Forerunners (1960s and 1970s) 

Critic John Stickney used the term "gothic rock" to describe the music of the Doors in October 1967, in a review published in The Williams Record. Stickney wrote that the band met the journalists "in the gloomy vaulted wine cellar of the Delmonico hotel, the perfect room to honor the gothic rock of the Doors". The author noted that contrary to the "pleasant, amusing hippies", there was "violence" in their music and a dark atmosphere on stage during their concerts.

Musicians who initially shaped the aesthetics and musical conventions of gothic rock include Marc Bolan, the Velvet Underground, the Doors, David Bowie, Brian Eno, and Iggy Pop. Journalist Kurt Loder would write that the song "All Tomorrow's Parties" by the Velvet Underground is a "mesmerizing gothic-rock masterpiece". However, Reynolds considers Alice Cooper as "the true ungodly godfather of goth" due to his "theatrics and black humor".  Nico's 1968 album The Marble Index is sometimes described as "the first truly gothic album". With its stark sound, somber lyrics, and Nico's deliberate change in her look, the album became a crucial music and visual prototype for the gothic rock movement. Gothic rock creates a dark atmosphere by drawing influence from the drones used by protopunk group the Velvet Underground, and many gothic singers are influenced by the "deep and dramatic" vocal timbre of David Bowie, albeit singing at even lower pitches. J. G. Ballard was a strong lyrical influence for many of the early gothic rock groups; the Birthday Party drew on Arthur Rimbaud and Charles Baudelaire; the Cure drew on Albert Camus and Bauhaus drew on William S. Burroughs, Jack Kerouac, Greek mythology, Oscar Wilde and Antonin Artaud. Although gothic rock is an offshoot of post-punk, glam rock is another forerunner genre of gothic rock. Pitchfork wrote: "Although it abandoned the psychedelic color palette and exchanged alien worship for a vampire cult, goth kept glam's theatricality intact, as well as its openness to experimentation." Reynolds retrospectively described Kate Bush's 1978 song "Wuthering Heights" as "Gothic romance distilled into four-and-a-half minutes of gaseous rhapsody".

In the late 1970s, the word "gothic" was used to describe the atmosphere of post-punk bands like Siouxsie and the Banshees, Magazine and Joy Division. In a live review about a Siouxsie and the Banshees' concert in July 1978, critic Nick Kent wrote that concerning their performance, "parallels and comparisons can now be drawn with gothic rock architects like the Doors and, certainly, early Velvet Underground". In March 1979, Kent used the gothic adjective in his review of Magazine's second album, Secondhand Daylight. Kent noted that there was "a new austere sense of authority" to their music, with a "dank neo-Gothic sound". The second Siouxsie and the Banshees album, also released in 1979, was a precursor in several aspects. For journalist Alexis Petridis of The Guardian, "A lot of musical signifiers [...] – scything, effects-laden guitar, pounding tribal drums – are audible, on [...] Join Hands". In September, Joy Division's manager Tony Wilson described their music as "gothic" on the television show Something Else, and their producer Martin Hannett described their style as "dancing music with gothic overtones". In 1980, Melody Maker wrote that "Joy Division are masters of this gothic gloom". When their final album Closer came out a couple of months after the suicide of their singer Ian Curtis, Sounds noted in its review that there were "dark strokes of gothic rock".

Origins

Not long after, the "gothic" label "became a critical term of abuse" for a band like Bauhaus, who had arrived on the music scene in 1979. At the time, NME considered that "Siouxsie and the Banshees, Adam and the Ants and even[...] Joy Division" opened up "a potentially massive market" for newcomers like Bauhaus and Killing Joke: journalist Andy Gill then separated these two groups of bands, pointing out that there was a difference "between art and artifice".

However, Bauhaus's debut single, "Bela Lugosi's Dead", released in late 1979, was retrospectively considered to be the beginning of the gothic rock genre. According to Peter Murphy, the song was written to be tongue-in-cheek, but since the group performed it with "naive seriousness", that is how the audience understood it. Bauhaus released their debut album In the Flat Field in 1980, and the album is often considered the first gothic rock album.

In the early 1980s, post-punk bands such as Siouxsie and the Banshees and the Cure included more gothic characteristics in their music. According to Reynolds, with their fourth album, 1981's Juju, the Banshees included several gothic qualities, lyrically and sonically, whereas according to The Guardian, Juju was art rock on certain album tracks and pop on the singles. Their bassist, Steven Severin, attributed the aesthetic used by the Banshees around that time to the influence of the Cramps. The Cure's "oppressively dispirited" trio of albums, Seventeen Seconds (1980), Faith (1981) and Pornography (1982), cemented that group's stature in the genre. The line "It doesn't matter if we all die" began the Pornography album, which is considered as "the Cure's gothic piece de resistance". They would later become the most commercially successful of these groups. The Cure's style was "withdrawn", contrasting with their contemporaries like Nick Cave's band, the Birthday Party, who drew on blues and spastic, violent turmoil. With the Birthday Party's Junkyard album, Nick Cave combined "sacred and profane" things, using Old Testament imagery with stories about sin, curses and damnation. Their 1981 single "Release the Bats" was particularly influential in the scene.

Killing Joke were originally inspired by Public Image Ltd., borrowing from funk, disco, dub and, later, heavy metal. Calling their style "tension music", Killing Joke distorted these elements to provocative effect, as well as producing a morbid, politically charged visual style. Reynolds identified the Birthday Party and Killing Joke as essential proto-goth groups. Despite their legacy as progenitors of gothic rock, those groups disliked the label. Adam Ant's early work was also a major impetus for the gothic rock scene, and much of the fanbase came from his milieu. Other early contributors to the scene included UK Decay and Ireland's Virgin Prunes.

Gothic rock would not be adopted as "positive identity, a tribal rallying cry" until a shift in the scene in 1982. In London, the Batcave club opened 21 July 1982 to provide a venue for the goth scene: the band Specimen gave many concerts there. That same year, Ian Astbury of the band Southern Death Cult used the term "gothic goblins" to describe Sex Gang Children's fans. Southern Death Cult became icons of the scene, drawing aesthetic inspiration from Native American culture and appearing on the cover of NME in October.

Expansion of the scene 

In February 1983, the emerging scene was described as "positive punk" on the front cover of NME: in his article, journalist Richard North described Bauhaus, Theatre of Hate and UK Decay as "the immediate forerunners of today's flood", and declared, "So here it is: the new positive punk, with no empty promises of revolution, either in the rock'n'roll sense or the wider political sphere. Here is only a chance of self-awareness, of personal revolution, of colourful perception and galvanization of the imagination that startles the slumbering mind and body from their sloth". That year, myriad goth groups emerged, including Flesh for Lulu, Play Dead, Rubella Ballet, Gene Loves Jezebel, Blood and Roses, and Ausgang. The 4AD label released music in a more ethereal style, by groups such as Cocteau Twins, Dead Can Dance, and Xmal Deutschland. The Icelandic group Kukl also appeared in this period, which included Björk and other musicians who later participated in the Sugarcubes.

Reynolds has spoken of a shift from early goth to gothic rock proper, advanced by the Sisters of Mercy. As journalist Jennifer Park put it, "The original blueprint for gothic rock had mutated significantly. Doom and gloom was no longer confined to its characteristic atmospherics, but as the Sisters demonstrated, it could really rock". The Sisters of Mercy, who cited influences such as Leonard Cohen, Gary Glitter, Motörhead, the Stooges, the Velvet Underground, the Birthday Party, Suicide, and the Fall, created a new, harder form of gothic rock. In addition, they incorporated a drum machine. Reynolds identified their 1983 single "Temple of Love" as the quintessential goth anthem of the year, along with Southern Death Cult's "Fatman". The group created their own record label, Merciful Release, which also signed the March Violets, who performed in a similar style. According to Reynolds, the March Violets "imitated Joy Division sonically". Another band, the Danse Society was particularly inspired by the Cure's Pornography period.

Subsequent developments 

American gothic rock began with 45 Grave and Christian Death. This harder, more punk rock-influenced style of gothic rock became known as deathrock. Christian Death combined "self-consciously controversial tactics" with Los Angeles punk and heavy metal influences. Their singer Rozz Williams committed suicide by hanging in 1998 at age 34. 45 Grave was more inspired by heavy metal than Christian Death and featured female singer Dinah Cancer. Some punk and garage rock  bands like The Cramps, The Gun Club, Lydia Lunch, The Nuns, The Misfits and T.S.O.L. have been credited to be influential on both the sound and the aesthetics of the Goth subculture in America, being subsequently credited to be pioneers in the "Goth Punk" sub-genre. Notable 80's American Goth bands include Super Heroines, Human Drama, The Wake and Kommunity FK.

Later stages of Gothic Rock came with a shift in sound and commercial success. Southern Death Cult reformed as the Cult, a more conventional hard rock group. Bauhaus members reformed as the psychedelia-influenced Love and Rockets achieving both critical and commercial success during the late 80's and 90's. In their wake, the Mission, which included two former members of the Sisters of Mercy (Wayne Hussey and Craig Adams), achieved commercial success in the mid-1980s to early 1990s, as did Fields of the Nephilim and All About Eve. European groups inspired by gothic rock also proliferated, including Clan of Xymox. Other bands associated with gothic rock include All Living Fear, And Also the Trees, Balaam and the Angel, Claytown Troupe, Dream Disciples, Feeding Fingers, Inkubus Sukkubus, Libitina, Miranda Sex Garden, Nosferatu, Rosetta Stone, and Suspiria. The 1990s saw a resurgence of the goth subculture, fueled largely by crossover from the industrial, electronic and metal scenes; and goth culture and aesthetic again worked itself into the mainstream consciousness, inspiring thriving goth music scenes in most cities and notoriety throughout popular culture. Beginning in the early 1990s, gothic metal fused "the bleak, icy atmospherics of goth rock with the loud guitars and aggression of heavy metal". In the 2000s, critics regularly noticed the influence of goth on bands of that time period. English band the Horrors mixed 1960s garage rock with 1980s goth. When referencing female singer Zola Jesus, writers questioned if she announced the second coming of the genre as her music was described with this term.

Visual elements 
In terms of fashion, gothic bands incorporated influences from 19th-century Gothic literature along with horror films and, to a lesser extent, the BDSM culture. Gothic fashions within the subculture range from deathrock, punk, androgynous, Victorian, to Renaissance and medieval-style attire, or combinations of the above, most often with black clothing, makeup and hair. Crimped hair was popular among gothic fans in the 1980s.

Impact
In the 1990s, several acts including PJ Harvey, Marilyn Manson, Manic Street Preachers, and Nine Inch Nails included gothic characteristics in their music without being assimilated into the genre. According to Rolling Stone, PJ Harvey's music in 1993 "careens from blues to goth to grunge, often in the space of a single song" whereas American artists such as Marilyn Manson combined "atmosphere from goth and disco" with "industrial sound". In 1997, Spin qualified Portishead's second album as "gothic", "deadly" and "trippy". Critic Barry Walters observed that the group got "darker, deeper and more disturbing" in comparison to their debut album Dummy. In the late 2010s, the Twilight Sad included gothic elements in their music.

See also 
 List of gothic festivals
 List of gothic rock bands
 Goth subculture

References

Bibliography

Books

Journals

External links 
 

 
Rock

British styles of music
British rock music genres
Post-punk
1980s in music
1990s in music
20th-century music genres
Dark music genres